From Here to Eternity is a 1979 American three-part, six-hour television miniseries and a remake of the 1953 film From Here to Eternity based on the 1951 novel of the same name. All three conclude with the December 7, 1941, attack on Pearl Harbor. The miniseries originally aired in three two-hour installments on three consecutive Wednesdays on NBC on February 14, 21 and 28, 1979.

The story details the men and families of G Company, 24th Infantry Division, United States Army. There are two main sub-plots: First Sergeant Milt Warden’s (William Devane) ongoing affair with Karen Holmes (Natalie Wood), the wife of his commanding officer, and Private Robert E. Lee Prewitt's (Steve Railsback) affair with Lorene Rogers (Kim Basinger), a local prostitute.

Miniseries (1979)

Synopsis
It is April 1941 at Schofield Barracks, Hawaii and Pvt. Robert E. Lee Prewitt is new to G Company. He is a skilled boxer who unintentionally severely injured a fellow soldier in an exhibition boxing match.  As a result he refuses to be a boxer anymore.  This places him at odds with his company’s commanding  officer, Captain Holmes, who uses the reputation of many of the sergeants in his company as skilled boxers to further his military career. Facing pressure from the fascist-minded Gen. Barney Slater, who argues that the Army needs to control soldiers by fear of authority, Captain Holmes has many of his sergeants harass and abuse Prewitt in an attempt to pressure him to join the company's boxing team.  Prewitt is tough and refuses to bend to the pressure. The company's First Sergeant, Milt Warden, attempts to help Prewitt, but there is only so much he can do.

Prewitt becomes involved with Lorene Rogers, a local prostitute. Prewitt’s friend Private Angelo Maggio is sent to the stockade after being court martialed for getting drunk and fighting with MPs. Things take a turn for the worse when Pvt. Prewitt is sent to the stockade for a few months of what turns out to brutal mistreatment at the hands of the Sergeant of the Guard at the stockade, Sgt. Fatso Judson, a bully and a sadist. While in the stockade, Prewitt reunites with Maggio and finds that he has been nearly beaten to death by Judson. Maggio dies after panicking and falling out of the ambulance on his way to the hospital.  After Prewitt is released from the stockade he tracks downs Judson and kills him in a knife fight. Prewitt is wounded in the fight and he takes refuge at Lorene’s house while he heals.

Captain Holmes is promoted to major and leaves the company. The new company commander does not care about the boxing team. On December 7, 1941, the Japanese attack Pearl Harbor and Schofield Barracks. First Sergeant Warden organizes the men of his company. He and the other sergeants of the company go to the armory and get Browning Automatic Rifles (B.A.R.s) and .30 caliber Model 1919 machine guns and return fire to the attacking Japanese warplanes. Warden and his men shoot down one of the Japanese "Zeros".

Wanting to join in on the upcoming war, and with Warden promising to help smooth things over regarding Fatso’s murder if he reports back, Prewitt attempts to rejoin the company but is mortally wounded by a nervous sentry that same evening. As he lies dying, he says he knows that Sgt. Warden will take care of his body (make sure his death is marked “line of duty”) and makes sure that it gets a military burial. After he dies, Warden assures the guilt-ridden sentry that Prewitt’s death was going to happen one way or another. When asked by the other soldiers if Prewitt was a good soldier in his company, Warden replies, “Hell, he was the only soldier.”

Weekly series (1980)
The miniseries spawned a weekly primetime soap opera of the same name, with many cast members reprising their roles, including William Devane, Roy Thinnes, and Kim Basinger. However Natalie Wood did not return, instead the role of Karen Holmes was played by Barbara Hershey. Gary Swanson, who played Cpl Herbert in the miniseries, replaced Steve Railsback in the role of Robert E. Lee Prewitt in flashbacks, as did Claude Jones with Peter Boyle for the role of Fatso.

The show's two-hour pilot, From Here to Eternity: Pearl Harbor, premiered on March 10, 1980. Subsequent episodes ran for an hour. After less than a month, the show was taken off the air, with the remaining episodes airing later in the year as three 130-minute specials, From Here to Eternity: Island and Homecoming, From Here to Eternity: Crossroads and Secrets and From Here to Eternity: Aftermath and Revenge. The show's finale aired on August 16, 1980.

Cast

Episodes

Miniseries (1979)

Season 1 (1980)

Awards

References

External links 
 
 From Here to Eternity at Rotten Tomatoes

1979 television films
1979 films
1979 American television series debuts
1979 American television series endings
1970s American television miniseries
1979 drama films
Remakes of American films
Films based on American novels
NBC network original films
Films directed by Buzz Kulik
Films produced by Harve Bennett
Pearl Harbor films
American drama television films
1970s American films